Bukomansimbi District is a district in Central Uganda. The district is named after its main municipal center, Bukomansimbi, the location of the district headquarters.

Location
Bukomansimbi District is bordered by Gomba District to the north, Kalungu District to the east, Masaka District to the southeast, Lwengo District to the southwest and Sembabule District to the northwest. The coordinates of Bukomansimbi District are: 00 10S, 31 39E.

Overview
The district is new; having been created by act of parliament in 2010. It became functional on 1 July 2010, with its headquarters located at Bukomansimbi Town. It was formerly part of Masaka District, before it was split off as a separate independent district.

Population
In 1991, the national population census estimated the population at about 126,550. Eleven years later, the 2002 national census put the population at approximately 139,560. In 2012, the mid-year district population was estimated at 154,000.

See also
Bukomansimbi Town
Districts of Uganda
Central Region, Uganda

References

 
Districts of Uganda
Central Region, Uganda
Districts in Uganda